María de los Ángeles del Sagrado Corazón de Jesús Trujillo Martínez (born 10 June 1939, in Neuilly-sur-Seine, Grand Paris, France), known as Angelita Trujillo, is a Dominican writer. She is most known by her role as the predilect daughter of former Dominican dictator Rafael Trujillo.

Early life
Angelita Trujillo is the daughter of the Dominican Republic dictator Rafael Trujillo and his third wife María de los Ángeles Martínez y Alba, known as la Españolita because of her Spanish origin. She was born in the affluent Parisine suburb of Neuilly-sur-Seine.

Trujillo enjoyed a privileged childhood. She was a special envoy of the Dominican government to the coronation of Queen Elizabeth II of the United Kingdom in 1953. Two years later, the Fair for the Peace and Fraternity of the Free World, was held in Trujillo City (present-day Santo Domingo) where the 16-year-old Angelita, was crowned as "Queen Angelita I" to preside over the world's fair.

Exile
After her father’s assassination in 1961, the Trujillo family went into exile to Paris and later to Madrid. In Spain, Trujillo divorced Colonel Luis José León Estévez. After 7 years in Madrid, Trujillo moved to New York City, where she met Colonel Luis José Domínguez Rodríguez, and married him.

Personal life

Trujillo married Luis José León Estévez and Luis José Domínguez Rodríguez, both colonels of the Dominican Air Force. León Estévez hailed from Canca La Piedra in Tamboril (Santiago Province) and was son of Manuel de Jesús León Jimenes and Dolores Ercilia Estévez Cabrera; Domínguez Rodríguez was native to Gurabo (Santiago Province) and his parents were José Ramón Domínguez Méndez and Mercedes Cervanda Rodríguez Taveras.

In her first marriage she had three children: Luis José, Rafael Leónidas, and María de los Ángeles (b. Santo Domingo, April 1961; federal attorney and lawyer in the United States, she changed her surnames to "Domínguez Trujillo"); in her second marriage she gave birth to María Mercedes, Ramfis Domínguez-Trujillo (b. New York, 1970; presidential candidate to the Dominican Republic general election, 2020), María Laura, María Julia Domínguez-Trujillo.

Angelita Trujillo resides in Miami, Florida.

Works
"Trujillo, mi padre, en mis memorias" (2010)

References

Bibliography

"Trujillo en la intimidad de según su hija Flor". (1965)

Living people
1939 births
Dominican Republic expatriates in France
Dominican Republic expatriates in Spain
Dominican Republic expatriates in the United States
Dominican Republic people of Canarian descent
Dominican Republic people of French descent
Dominican Republic people of Haitian descent
Dominican Republic people of Spanish descent
People from Neuilly-sur-Seine
People from Santo Domingo
Rafael Trujillo
White Dominicans
Children of national leaders